Standard, also known historically as Donald B and Barbara H, is a paddlewheel towboat that has been named a US National Historic Landmark and is now based at Bellaire in eastern Ohio.  Built in 1923, she is the oldest surviving unaltered rear-wheel towboat afloat.  The boat was declared a National Historic Landmark in 1989.

Description and history
She draws . She is powered by a  1940 Fairbanks-Morse 35E10 direct reversing diesel engine. She is fashioned out of steel plates riveted to a steel frame. She has a scow-form bow fitted with special "knees" used in pushing barges, and a flat bottom with no keel.

She was laid down in 1923 at Marietta Manufacturing in Point Pleasant, West Virginia, and entered the service of the Standard Oil Company of Ohio as Standard, who used her to move gasoline to distribution points along the river.  She was sold in 1940 to Ray Brookbank, who renamed her Donald B after his son, who eventually became her captain.  Under the Brookbanks' ownership she engaged in general service, moving all manner of barges up and down the Mississippi River watershed.  Her hull was completely replated in 1958.  Her service as a towboat ended in 2000, and she was sold the following year to Steve Huffman, who named her Barbara H after his wife, and berthed her near Vevey, Indiana.  Huffman sold her to Bob Hamilton in 2012, who relocated her to Bellaire, Ohio.

Boats of a comparable age have either been scrapped, altered from their original configuration for private use, or are in museum collections.  At the time of her landmark designation, she was the only rear-wheel diesel towboat in active service.

Nomenclature
Standard (1923–1940), owned by Standard Oil Company of Ohio
Donald B (1940–2001), named after the owner's son, Donald Brookbank, who later became her captain
Barbara H (2001–2012), named after the captain's wife, Barbara Huffman
Standard (2012–)

Vessels that move barges on the Mississippi River and its tributaries are known as "towboats" despite the fact that they do not tow barges, but always push them from behind.

See also
List of National Historic Landmarks in Ohio
National Register of Historic Places listings in Belmont County, Ohio

References

Ships on the National Register of Historic Places in Ohio
National Historic Landmarks in Ohio
Buildings and structures in Belmont County, Ohio
Towboats
National Register of Historic Places in Belmont County, Ohio